Fromia monilis, common name necklace starfish or tiled starfish, is a species of starfish belonging to the family Goniasteridae.

Description

Tips of the arms and the disc center of this starfish are bright red, while the remaining parts are paler, forming large plates.

The appearance of this sea star can be highly variable (colors, plates, presence of plates on the central disc, armpits...), and its identification using picture can be difficult, as many other species (like Fromia nodosa) can have a very similar aspect.

Distribution
This species can be found in the Indian Ocean and Western Pacific, from the Andaman islands up to Australia and Japan.

Ecology
It feeds on encrusting sponges, detritus or small invertebrates.

Nutrition and management of the aquarium
The species is also considered in reef aquariums. It feeds on the surface of the stones in a thin layers of algae, so it can live only in an old well-ripened aquarium. If the algae are not growing fast enough, supplemental feeding is usually unsuccessful, and this starfish dies of starvation.

References

Notes

External links

 
 FROMIA MONILIS - (PERRIER, 1869) - New Caledonia
 

monilis
Starfish described in 1869